Malcolm Henry Stern (January 29, 1915 – January 5, 1994) was an American rabbi, historian, and genealogist. Through the work he did that supported secular genealogical communities and resources, as well as created what is the structure and backbone of current Jewish genealogical societies, Stern's efforts created long-lasting, far-reaching cooperative organizations. For these reasons, Stern has been described as the dean of American Jewish genealogy.

Early life 
Stern was born in Philadelphia, to Arthur Kaufman Stern and Henrietta Stern (née Berkowitz). In his early childhood, his family moved from Philadelphia to a farm in Fox Chase, Pennsylvania, where he grew up. He had one brother, Edward Stern.

Stern's family was from the early German Jewish community of Philadelphia. His father and grandfather worked at the family business, Jacob Stern & Sons, where they were hides and tallow processors. In the 1920s, Stern's father sold his share of the business to retire to the farm in Fox Chase; Stern described this as his father's attempts to be a bit of a gentleman farmer, as well as author, playwright, and painter. After the Wall Street Crash of 1929, Stern's father became an independent real estate agent.

Stern's mother was active in organizing Jewish summer camps for Philadelphia-area children. She was involved in supporting the National Farm School (now the Delaware Valley College of Science and Agriculture), which was founded by her uncle Rabbi Joseph Krauskopf in 1896, and where her ashes are now interred. She was also active with the local Juvenile Aid Society. The foster children would often spend Sundays at the family's farm in Fox Chase.

Stern said that when they moved from the tight-knit German Jewish community in Philadelphia to Fox Chase, where they were the first Jews in the neighborhood, he and his brother would get chased home and called anti-semitic names.

Education 
For parts of his childhood, Stern's parents took the family to Europe, where they traveled extensively. He learned German from a German governess in Hamburg. Stern spent seven months in school in Lausanne, Switzerland.

In 1935, Stern received a BA from the University of Pennsylvania. In 1937, Stern received a Bachelor of Hebrew Letters from Hebrew Union College in Cincinnati. He earned a Master of Hebrew Letters in 1941 and the Doctor of Hebrew Letters in American Jewish History in 1957, all from Hebrew Union College. In 1966, Stern received a Doctor of Divinity degree from Hebrew Union College.

Career

Rabbinic career

Philadelphia 
As did many of his family members, Stern attended Hebrew Union College, where he studied to be a rabbi.

From 1941 to 1943, Stern was assistant rabbi to Rabbi Fineshriber at the Reform Congregation Keneseth Israel, in Philadelphia, where his great-uncle, Joseph Krauskopf had previously served as rabbi. After the war, from 1946 to 1947, Stern returned to work as a rabbi at Keneseth Israel.

In 1942, Stern was one of 90 Reform rabbis to sign a statement in support of aid to Palestine. The published statement said that the signatories were "opposing growing secularism and favoring greater emphasis on transcendent moral and religious values and principles in American life."

In 1943, Stern took a sabbatical from his position at Keneseth Israel to serve a Chaplain in the US Army Air Corps. During this time, during World War II, Stern almost died when his plane crashed at Casablanca during a flight to India; in a letter home to his father that was published in the local press, Stern said he felt lucky to have only broken an arm and a leg.

Norfolk, Virginia
From 1947 to 1964, Stern was Rabbi of Ohef Sholom Temple in Norfolk, Virginia. During his time there, he completed his Doctor of Hebrew Letters in 1957 in American Jewish History under the tutelage of Dr. Jacob Rader Marcus.

Stern was an amateur musicologist, writing program notes for the Norfolk Symphony Orchestra. He also served as chairman of the Committee on Synagogue Music of the Central Conference of American Rabbis.

In 1960, Stern served as editor in chief of the Union Songster for Reform Judaism and coordinated the revision of the Union Hymnal, both of which are considered by Reform Jews to be the commonly used hymnals for religious services. He co-edited Songs and Hymns for Gates of Prayer, the New Union Prayer Book (GOP) that is a Reform Jewish siddur. He chaired the committee that created Shaarei Shira/Gates of Song.

New York City 
From 1964 to 1980, Stern was the Central Conference of American Rabbis' first Director of Rabbinic Placement for Reform Judaism, assigning rabbis to congregations.

After leaving CCAR in 1980, Stern joined Hebrew Union College's faculty as Adjunct Professor, where he lectured in Jewish History. He was also a field-work counselor for rabbinic students. Stern held both positions until his death. Hebrew Union President, Dr. Alfred Gottschalk, said Stern's "scholarship, his pioneering seminal research in American Jewish genealogy and writings remain a rich legacy and memorial."

Genealogy career 

Stern's interest in genealogy, he said, "started in grade school when he traced the descendants of Charlemagne for an assignment."

From 1949 to 1994, Stern was the genealogist for the American Jewish Archives in Cincinnati.

In 1960, Stern published Americans of Jewish Descent, in which he created extensive, fully sourced, family tree diagrams of all Jewish families who lived in American pre-1840. The work contained 26,000 names. Two more editions of the book followed: 1978's First American Jewish Families: 600 Genealogies, 1654–1977 and 1991's First American Jewish Families: 600 Genealogies, 1654–1988, which had over 50,000 surnames. The book was groundbreaking because of the volume of names and the thoroughness of the research. Many pre-1840, non-Jewish families discovered they had Jewish roots. It was considered one of the most valuable research tools in American Jewish genealogy and history. The work in these books was a source for much of Stephen Birmingham's 1981 book, The Grandees: America's Sephardic Elite.

Stern was responsible for helping to establish the early Jewish genealogical societies in the United States. He was on the committee that hosted the first of what would become the annual International Conference on Jewish Genealogy now sponsored by the International Association of Jewish Genealogical Societies (IAJGS). He was instrumental in founding IAJGS.

During his time as President of the Federation of Genealogical Societies, Stern worked to create the Genealogical Coordinating Committee. In a meeting in Salt Lake City in 1980, Stern brought together leaders from various genealogical entities—FGS, American Society of Genealogists, Association of Genealogical Educators, Association of Professional Genealogists, Board for Certification of Genealogists, International Association of Jewish Genealogical Societies (IAJGS) and the National Genealogical Society—with a goal to foster better relationships between various genealogical groups that had common interests, especially supporting the work of the National Archives and Records Administration (NARA) so it would be available to genealogists. This meeting led to the formation of the Genealogical Coordinating Committee two years later, with a resulting National Archives Gift Fund (now known as the Malcolm H. Stern NARA Gift Fund) established. The purpose of the fund was to support NARA and other genealogical interests. Member organizations donated $1 per genealogist per year.

Activism 
 While in Norfolk, Virginia, Stern was a civil right advocate, working against segregation and racism in the community Rabbi Kerry M. Olitzky said that Stern "fought for the civil rights of African Americans at a time and a place where such a stand was both unpopular and dangerous."
 In 1951, Stern spoke at the Hunton Branch YMCA's "Y's" Men's Club urging members to donate blood, he said, "in order to show belief in the equality of races, since no distinction on account of color is made between blood donated at the center."
 NARA Independence (1981-1984)
 In 1981, when President Ronald Reagan's budget threatened the National Archives, Stern spearheaded efforts of genealogy and historical communities to support Archives Independence Bill S1421, in order to make NARA independent. On June 21, 1984, the United States Senate voted unanimously to S. 905, a bill that would separate NARA from the General Services Administration. On August 2, 1984, the House of Representatives passed similar legislation.
 In 1989, Stern testified before the United States Congress, where he stated that the Archivist of the United States should not be an administrator, but rather a scholar.
 In 1990, Stern worked with the National Archives and Records Administration to prepare four American genealogists for a genealogical mission to Russia, where they had been invited to help educate former Soviet archivists on how to respond to American requests for information about Russian ancestry. As part of these efforts, Stern helped to found the Russian-American Genealogical Archival Service (RAGAS).

Membership activities 
Alphabetical by organization
 Trustee, American Jewish Historical Society
 President (1976–1979), American Society of Genealogists. Also: Secretary, 1968–1973; Vice President, 1973-1976
 Trustee, Federation of Genealogical Societies. Also: Vice President, 1985-1988
 President (1979–1984), Jewish Genealogical Society
 Member, Jewish Historical Society of England
 Founder, Jewish Historical Society of New York
 Fellow, National Genealogical Society
 Fellow, New York Genealogical and Biographical Society
 Vice President of Gomez Mill House in Newburgh, New York, oldest surviving Jewish residence (built in 1716) in North America

Ten Commandments for Genealogists 
Stern wrote the Ten Commandments for Genealogists, which has become widely cited and is a cornerstone of Jewish genealogy.

Honors 
 1986: "Living Treasures," by View From the Torch, an organization devoted to promoting New York's cultural, ethnic and artistic diversity. People who have made significant contributions to New York City. Certificate of recognition from the New York Chamber of Commerce and Industry
 1987: Jewish Genealogical Society (New York), Testimonial Brunch
 1988: Federation of Genealogical Societies' George E. Williams Award for outstanding contributions to the FGS and to the genealogical community
 Stern was and is the only Jewish Fellow of both the Federation of Genealogical Societies and the American Society of Genealogists

Gift funds/grants 
 Ongoing: Federation of Genealogical Societies' Malcolm H. Stern NARA Gift Fund. Finances preservation of research materials at National Archives and Records Administration (NARA)
 Ongoing: IAJGS' Rabbi Malcolm Stern Grant

Personal life 
In 1941, Stern married Louise Steinhart Bergman. They had no children. In 1994, Stern died in New York City of a heart attack.

Stern's maternal great uncle is the Rabbi Joseph Krauskopf.

Works and publications 
Chronological order

Archival papers 
 Stern, Malcolm Henry. Malcolm H. Stern Papers, 1882-1994. New York, NY: American Jewish Archives.

Monographs 
 Stern, Malcolm H. The Jews of Norfolk. Norfolk, Va: M.H. Stern, 1950. 
 Stern, Malcolm H. Two Studies in the Assimilation of Early American Jewry I. Endogamic. II. Exogamic, Based on Tentatively Complete Genealogical Tables of All Jewish Families Settled in America Prior to 1840. Thesis/dissertation. Cincinnati: Hebrew Union College/Jewish Institute of Religion, 1956. 
 Stern, Malcolm H. The Descendants of Salomon Jaroslawski. S.l: s.n., 1956. 
 Stern, Malcolm H. The Function of Genealogy in American Jewish History. Cincinnati: (Hebrew Union College Press), 1958. 
 Postal, Bernard, and Malcolm H. Stern. Tourist's Guide to Jewish History in the Caribbean. [New York]: American Airlines, 1975. 
 Stern, Malcolm H. Jewish Family Genealogies and Histories. Salt Lake City, Utah: Filmed by the Genealogical Society of Utah, 1977. 
 Stern, Malcolm H. Death Notices, Mostly from Charleston Newspapers, from Elzas Papers. Salt Lake City, Utah: Filmed by the Genealogical Society of Utah, 1977. 
 Stern, Malcolm H. Tracing Your Jewish Roots. Cincinnati, OH: American Jewish Archives on the Cincinnati Campus of the Hebrew Union College-Jewish Institute of Religion, 1977.

Jewish Families Series 
 Stern, Malcolm H. Americans of Jewish Descent: A Compendium of Genealogy. Publications of the American Jewish Archives, 5. New York: Ktav Pub. House, 1960.  
 Stern, Malcolm H. First American Jewish Families: 600 Genealogies, 1654-1977. Cincinnati: American Jewish Archives, 1978.  
 Stern, Malcolm H. First American Jewish Families: 600 Genealogies, 1654-1988. Baltimore, Md: Ottenheimer Publishers, 1991.  
 First American Jewish Families at American Jewish Archives

Articles 
 Stern, Malcolm H. "Monticello and the Levy Family". The Journal of the Southern Jewish Historical Society. Vol. 1, no. 2 (October 1959). pp. 19–23. 
 Stern, Malcolm H. What Shall We Sing: Music in Our Worship. 1960. 
 Stern, Malcolm H. "New Light on the Jewish Settlement of Savannah." 1963. Reprinted from American Jewish Historical Quarterly, v.52, no. 3, Mar. 1963. pp. 169–199. 
 Stern, Malcolm H. The Descendants of Moses Son of Naphtali of Hofheim or Moses Hofheimer. 1964. Hofheimer Family, Manuscripts and Rare Books Department, Swem Library, College of William & Mary. 
 Stern, Malcolm H. "The Sheftall Diaries: Vital Records of Savannah Jewry (1733-1808)." 1965. Detached from American Jewish Historical Society, American Jewish Historical Quarterly, New York, v. LIV, No. 3 (March, 1965). pp. 243–277. 
 Stern, Malcolm H. "Two Jewish Functionaries in Colonial Pennsylvania." Philadelphia, PA: Maurice Jacobs, Inc., 1967. Reprinted from American Jewish Historical Quarterly, v.57, no. 1. pp. 24–51. 
 Stern, Malcolm H. "Necrology: Thomas Jefferson Tobias (1906-1970)." Philadelphia, Pa: Press of Maurice Jacobs, 1971. Reprinted from American Jewish Historical Quarterly, v. 60, no. 3 (March, 1971). pp. 304–305 
 Stern, Malcolm H. '"A Successful Caribbean Restoration: The Nevis Story." Reprint from American Jewish Historical Quarterly, Vol. 61, Nov. 1, 1971. pp. 19–32. 
 Stern, Malcolm H. "Reforming of Reform Judaism - Past, Present, and Future." Reprint from American Jewish Historical Quarterly, Vol 63, No. 2, 1973. pp. 111–137. 
 Stern, Malcolm H. "South Carolina Jewish Marriage Settlements, 1785-1839." Washington, D.C.: National Genealogical Society, 1978. Detached from National Genealogical Society Quarter. v.66, no. 2 (June 1978). pp. 105–111. 
 Stern, Malcolm H. "New Sources of Jewish Genealogy." From National Genealogical Society Quarterly, v. 66 (1978). pp. 281–284. 
 Stern, Malcolm H. "The Role of the Rabbi in the South." Kaganaff, Nathan and Melvin I. Urofsky, Editors. Turn to the South, Essays on Southern Jewry, 1979. pp. 21–32. 
 Stern, Malcolm H. "Jewish Genealogy: An Annotated Bibliography." Nashville: American Association for State and Local History, 1981. Technical leaflet (American Association for State and Local History), #138. Detached from History News. v. 36, no. 5 (May 1981). 
 Stern, Malcolm H., and A. Stanley Dreyfus. "Jews of Texas: Some Sources for Their Genealogy." Houston, Tex.: Texas State Genealogical Society, 1982. From Stirpes, v.22 no. 4 (Dec. 1982). 
 Peck, Abraham J., and Jonathan D. Sarna. Biz Hundert Un Tsvantsik!: A Tribute Volume for Dr. Jacob Rader Marcus on the Occasion of His 90th Birthday. Cincinnati, Ohio: Hebrew Union College-Jewish Institute of Religion, 1986.  - Stern contributed a tribute to his teacher, Dr. Marcus, in this volume.
 Stern, Malcolm H. "Portuguese Sephardim in the Americas," Cohen, Martin A., and Abraham J. Peck. Sephardim in the Americas: Studies in Culture and History. Tuscaloosa: University of Alabama Press, 1993.  
 Stern, Malcolm. "The year they closed the schools : the Norfolk story." Bauman, Mark K., and Berkley Kalin. The Quiet Voices: Southern Rabbis and Black Civil Rights, 1880s to 1990s. Tuscaloosa, Ala: University of Alabama Press, 1997, 2007.

Lectures, speeches, etc. 
 Stern, Malcolm H. Church Records of the United States, Part B: Part 1 Jewish Synagogue Records. Salt Lake City: Genealogical Society of Utah, 1969. Paper presented at the World Conference on Records and Genealogical Seminar, Salt Lake City, Utah, 5–8 August 1969. 
 Stern, Malcolm H., and Marc Angel. New York's Early Jews: Some Myths and Misconceptions. A Lecture by Malcolm H. Stern, with Response by Marc D. Angel. New York: Jewish Historical Society of New York, 1975. Annual Meeting, Jewish Historical Society of New York, at Congregation Shearith Israel on April 10, 1975. 
 Stern, Malcolm H. Consecrated to Them: Ordination Address, Class of 1979, Hebrew Union College-Jewish Institute of Religion, Cincinnati, Ohio, June 9, 1979. Cincinnati: Hebrew Union College-Jewish Institute of Religion, 1979. 
 Stern, Malcolm H. Jewish Families: Their Assimilation into North American Culture. World Conference on Records; Preserving our Heritage, Aug. 12-15, 1980. ser. 327. U.S.A.: Corp. of the President of the Church of Jesus Christ of Latter-day Saints, 1980. 
 Stern, Malcolm H. Fraunces Tavern Museum and the American Jewish Historical Society Present "A Walking Tour of Early Jewish New York ; " with the Cooperation of the Jewish Historical Society of New York. New York: Fraunces Tavern Museum, 1980. NYPL: MN *ZZ-20157. 12 pages, includes map. 
 Stern, Malcolm H. Fraunces Tavern Museum and the American Jewish Historical Society Present "A Walking Tour of Early Jewish New York". New York: Fraunces Tavern Museum, 1982. Walking tour of early Jewish New York, 2 pages, includes map. 
 Stern, Malcolm H. History of Jewish Surnaming. Pekin, Ill: Triad, 1984. Audio cassette. Recorded July 22–25, 1984, at the Fourth National Summer Seminar on Jewish Genealogy. 
 Stern, Malcolm H. "Jacob R. Marcus : American Jewish history personified." Stern, Malcolm H., A. Bartlett Giamatti, and Lou H. Silberman. Founders Day Addresses, 1986. Cincinnati, Ohio: Hebrew Union College-Jewish Institute of Religion, 1986. 
 Stern, Malcolm H. Resources at [the] DAR Library. Toulon, IL: Triad, 1988. Audio cassette. Recorded at Seventh National Seminar in Jewish Genealogy, Washington, D.C., 1988. 
 Stern, Malcolm H. Where Was Bubba Born? The Changing Map of Europe (1492-1952). Toulon, IL: Triad, 1989. Audio cassette. Recorded at the 8th national seminar on Jewish genealogy, June 1989, Philadelphia, Pa. 
 Stern, Malcolm H., and Harold I. Saperstein. Centennial Birthday Party Reminiscences. Palm Desert, Calif: Convention Cassettes Unlimited, 1989. Audio cassettes. Recorded at centennial convention of CCAR, June 1989, Cincinnati, Ohio. 
 Stern, Malcolm H. Resources for Sephardic Research. Teaneck, N.J.: Association of Jewish Genealogical Societies, 1991. Audio cassette. Recorded at Third International Seminar on Jewish Genealogy, July 1991, Doubletree Hotel, Salt Lake City, Utah. 
 Jewish Genealogical Society (New York, N.Y.), and Malcolm H. Stern. The Jewish Genealogical Society Celebrates Its Tenth Anniversary and Honors Its President Emeritus, Rabbi Malcolm H. Stern: Sunday, November 15, 1987. New York, N.Y. : Jewish Genealogical Society, 1987. 
 Although planned before his death, event was held posthumously in Stern's honor

See also 
 Jewish genealogy
 Federation of Genealogical Societies
 International Association of Jewish Genealogical Societies (IAJGS)
 JewishGen

References

External links 
 Malcolm H. Stern Papers at American Jewish Archives
 First American Jewish Families at American Jewish Archives

American genealogists
American people of German-Jewish descent
Jewish genealogy
Fellows of the American Society of Genealogists
Hebrew Union College – Jewish Institute of Religion alumni
1915 births
1994 deaths
University of Pennsylvania alumni
20th-century American rabbis